The Bromo, or Mount Bromo is an active somma volcano and part of the Tengger mountains, in East Java, Indonesia.  At  it is not the highest peak of the massif, but the most famous. The area is one of the most visited tourist destinations in East Java, and the volcano is included in the Bromo Tengger Semeru National Park. The name Bromo comes from the Javanese pronunciation of Brahma, the Hindu god of creation. At the mouth of the crater, there is an idol of Ganesha, the Hindu god of wisdom which is being worshipped by the Javanese Hindus. Mount Bromo is located in the middle of a plain called "Sea of Sand" (Javanese: Segara Wedi or Indonesian: Lautan Pasir), a nature reserve that has been protected since 1919.

A typical way to visit Mount Bromo is from the nearby mountain village of Cemoro Lawang. From there it is possible to walk to the volcano in about 45 minutes, but it is also possible to take an organized jeep tour, including stops at the viewpoint of Mount Penanjakan (Indonesian: Gunung Penanjakan). The sights on Mount Penanjakan can also be reached on foot in about two hours. Depending on the level of volcanic activity, the Indonesian Center for Volcanology and Disaster Mitigation sometimes issues a warning not to visit Mount Bromo.

History of volcanic activity

2004 eruptions 

Mount Bromo erupted in 2004. That eruptive episode led to the death of two people who had been hit by rocks from the explosion.

2010 eruptions 

On Tuesday, 23 November 2010, 16.30 WIB (Western Indonesian Time), the Indonesian Centre of Vulcanology and Geology Hazard Mitigation  (CVGHM) confirmed the activity status of Mount Bromo at "alert" due to increasing tremor activity and shallow volcanic earthquakes at the mountain. Concerns were raised that a volcanic eruption might be likely to occur. As a precaution, local residents and tourists were instructed to remain clear of an area within a radius of three kilometers from the caldera and refugee encampments were erected. The area surrounding the Teggera caldera of Bromo remained off-limits for visitors throughout the remainder of 2010.

Bromo started to violently erupt ash on Friday 26 November 2010.

On 29 November 2010, Transport Ministry spokesman Bambang Ervan announced that Malang's domestic airport would be closed until 4 December 2010. Abdul Rachman Saleh Airport normally handles 10 daily domestic flights from the capital Jakarta. Government volcanologist Surono reported that the volcano was spitting columns of ash some  into the sky.

2011 eruptions 

The Tengger Caldera was still active in late January 2011, the activity being characterised by fluctuating ongoing eruptions. On 23 January 2011, the Indonesian Centre for Volcanology and Geological Hazard Mitigation (CVGHM; Pusat Vulkanologi dan Mitigasi Bencana Geologi) reported that since 19 December 2010 volcanic ash and incandescent material had been thrown up by eruptive activity resulting in a heavy rain of material that fell around the crater. Continuous eruptions on 21 January caused a thin ash fall mainly in the village areas of Ngadirejo and Sukapura Wonokerto in Probolinggo Regency.

The impact of a heavy rain of volcanic ash from eruptions since 19 December 2010 resulted in disruption of normal activities. By early 2011, concerns were being raised about the effect upon the local economy and the potential for long-term environmental and health problems amongst the residents in the locality surrounding Mount Bromo. Due to high seasonal rainfall in January 2011 the potential for lahar and lava flow was raised due to the deposits of volcanic ash, sand and other ejected material that had built up. Seismic activity was dominated by tremor vibration and reports of visual intensity and sounds of eruption continued to be reported from the mountain monitoring facility, Bromo Observation Post.  People living on the banks of the Perahu Ravine, Nganten Ravine and Sukapura River were alerted to the possibility of lava flows, especially when it was raining heavily in the area around Cemorolawang, Ngadisari and Ngadirejo. Eruptions and volcanic tremors were reported during the period 21 January – 22 January with activity subsiding on 23 January 2011. On 23 January 2011 at 6:00 am, the alert status at Mount Bromo remained at Level III.

On 23 January 2011, an exclusion zone was recommended for communities living around Mount Bromo. Operational caution was recommended for flights into and leaving Juanda International Airport IATA:SUB in Surabaya. CVGHM recommended the establishment of public areas for the provision of face masks and eye protection. CVGHM also issued a warning to residents to be cautious of ash buildup on roofs and other places that may give cause for collapse under the burden of ash.

Further eruptions and the issuing of aviation ash advisories during the period 27–28 January 2011 led to concerns being raised regarding a volcanic ash plume, reported to be drifting eastward toward the air corridors used to access the Ngurah Rai International Airport IATA:DPS in Bali. Airport official Sherly Yunita was reported at the time as stating that concerns about visibility had prompted Singapore Airlines, Jetstar-ValueAir, Air France-KLM, Virgin Blue and Cathay Pacific to cancel several flights to Bali,  to the east. SilkAir also cancelled flights on the 27 January between Singapore and Lombok,  an island to the east of Bali. The Volcanic Ash Advisory Centre in Darwin, Australia released several Code Red  Aviation Ash Advisories pertaining to Mount Bromo (Tengger Caldera), on 27 January. In other ash advisories of that day the cloud was reported as at times having a  drift, both to the east and to the south east.

Deformation-late November 2010-late January 2011
The Indonesian Centre for Volcanology and Geological Hazard Mitigation (CVGHM)  reported on 13 January 2011, that deformation using tiltmeter measurements indicated an inflation at rate of 5 micro radians between 25 November 2010 – 14 December 2010 and a relatively stable since 15 December 2010 both on Radial Components and Tangential Components.

Deformation measurement using electronic distance measurement equipment compared observations at designated measuring points; POS-BRO, POS-KUR and POS-BAT during the period 25 November 2010 – 20 December 2010 with observations from the period 21 December 2010 – 30 December 2010 indicated the shortening of the distance from the POS-BAT, or inflation. Observations between 30 December 2010 – 23 January 2011 were reported as relatively stable.

2015 eruption
Mount Bromo showed signs of increasing activity beginning in 4th Dec 2015, when the amount of smoke coming out of the crater intensified. By late November Mount Bromo began to eject ashes into the air. Indonesian Volcano Monitoring Bureau (PVBMG) issued a warning that forbade people from climbing Mount Bromo. Later, the warning was extended into a  exclusion zone, before eventually extended into wider range which virtually barred visitors from coming down into the caldera floor, which is popularly known as Sandsea.

Culture

On the fourteenth day of the Hindu festival of Yadnya Kasada, the Tenggerese people of Probolinggo Regency, East Java, travel up the mountain in order to make offerings of fruit, rice, vegetables, flowers and sacrifices of livestock to the mountain gods by throwing them into the caldera of the volcano. The origin of the ritual lies in the 15th century legend.
On the sand plain, locally called Segara Wedi (lit. sand ocean), sits a Hindu temple called Pura Luhur Poten. The temple holds a significant importance to the Tenggerese scattered across the mountain villages, such as Ngadisari, Wonokitri, Ngadas, Argosari, Ranu Prani, Ledok Ombo and Wonokerso. The temple organises the annual Yadnya Kasada ceremony which lasts for about one month. The major difference between this temple and Balinese ones are the type of stones and building materials. Pura Luhur Poten uses natural black stones from volcanoes nearby, while Balinese temples are mostly made from red bricks. Inside this pura, there are several buildings and enclosures aligned in a mandala zone composition.

Gallery

See also
 Deep Earth Carbon Degassing Project
 List of volcanoes in Indonesia
 Multi-component gas analyzer system
 Volcanism of Java

References

External links

 Photos of the 2010/11 eruption of Bromo 
 Villagers use sarongs to catch offerings thrown by Hindu worshipers into the crater of Mount Bromo from The Daily Telegraph
 
Picture Gallery from 2019 with Mount Bromo

Stratovolcanoes of Indonesia
Subduction volcanoes
Volcanoes of East Java
Mountains of East Java
Active volcanoes of Indonesia
21st-century volcanic events
Cultural Properties of Indonesia in East Java